The 1971 NCAA University Division Cross Country Championships were the 33rd annual cross country meet to determine the team and individual national champions of men's collegiate cross country running in the United States. Held on November 22, 1971, the meet was hosted by the University of Tennessee at the Fox Den Country Club in Knoxville, Tennessee. The distance for this race was 6 miles (9.7 kilometers).

All NCAA University Division members were eligible to qualify for the meet. In total, 17 teams and 285 individual runners contested this championship.

The team national championship was won by the Oregon Ducks, their first title. The individual championship was retained by Steve Prefontaine, from Oregon, with a time of 29:14.00, although he was unable to break his meet distance record from the previous year.

Men's title
Distance: 6 miles (9.7 kilometers)

Team Result (Top 10)

See also
NCAA Men's Division II Cross Country Championship

References
 

NCAA Cross Country Championships
NCAA University Division Cross Country Championships
NCAA Division I Cross Country Championships
NCAA Division I Cross Country Championships
Sports in Knoxville, Tennessee
Track and field in Tennessee
University of Tennessee